Plagiostropha costata is a species of sea snail, a marine gastropod mollusk in the family Drilliidae.

Description

Distribution
This species occurs in the demersal zone of the Indian Ocean off La Réunion at depths between 170 m and 225 m.

References

  Tucker, J.K. 2004 Catalog of recent and fossil turrids (Mollusca: Gastropoda). Zootaxa 682:1–1295

External links
 Holotype at MNHN, Paris

costata
Gastropods described in 1995